Edmonton Borough Football Club was a football club based in Edmonton, England.

History
Edmonton Borough were formed in 1947, playing their first game against Chelsea reserves in a 7–4 friendly loss. Upon formation, Edmonton joined the London League Premier Division. In Edmonton's first season, they entered the FA Cup for the first time, reaching the preliminary round. In 1950, Edmonton Borough merged with Tufnell Park to form Tufnell Park Edmonton.

Ground
Edmonton Borough played at the Henry Barrass Stadium in Edmonton.

Records
Best FA Cup performance: Preliminary round, 1947–48

References

London League (football)
Sport in the London Borough of Enfield
Edmonton, London
1947 establishments in England
Association football clubs established in 1947
1950 disestablishments in England
Association football clubs disestablished in 1950
Defunct football clubs in London